The Williams House, at 500 Fifth St. in Stevensville, Montana, was built in 1903.  It is a modest one-story cottage, with some degree of Queen Anne style, including decorative vergeboards. It was listed on the National Register of Historic Places in 1991.

A historic clapboard chicken coop, at the northeast corner of the property, was in poor condition in 1990 but was considered a second contributing building.

References

National Register of Historic Places in Ravalli County, Montana
Queen Anne architecture in Montana
Houses completed in 1903
1903 establishments in Montana
Houses on the National Register of Historic Places in Montana
Houses in Ravalli County, Montana